Lower Sorbian Gymnasium Cottbus, is a coeducational gymnasium (e.g. preparatory high school or grammar school) in Cottbus the second-largest city in Brandenburg, Germany. It is the only high school in Lower Lusatia in which education is organized in Lower Sorbian language and the language is compulsory up to the twelfth grade. While German language is widely used as the first language by many students and professors, in May 2005 and following the 2004 enlargement of the European Union some students recognized education in the school as a good preparation for future participation in economic exchanges with neighboring West Slavic countries of Czech Republic and Poland.

See also
 Secondary education
 Brandenburg University of Technology
 Upper Sorbian Gymnasium in Bautzen

References

Secondary schools in Germany
Educational institutions established in 1952
Bilingual schools
1952 establishments in East Germany
Gymnasiums in Germany
Minority schools
Buildings and structures in Cottbus
Sorbian culture